The Slovenian Republic Football League was the highest football league in Slovenia within the Yugoslav football system.

During the time of the Kingdom of Yugoslavia it was known as the Ljubljana Subassociation League and was one of the qualifying tournaments for the Yugoslav Championship. During the time of Yugoslavia, it was a third level league for most of the time, but became a fourth level in 1988. Before that, the winner was promoted to the Yugoslav Second League, and after that it was promoted to the Yugoslav Inter-Republic League. After Slovenia's independence in 1991, the league was transformed into the Slovenian PrvaLiga.

Winners

Kingdom of Yugoslavia period

Known as the Ljubljana Subassociation League at the time.

Yugoslavia period

Performance by club

Top scorers

References

 
Football leagues in Slovenia
4
Defunct third level football leagues in Europe
Sports leagues established in 1920
1920 establishments in Slovenia